Carolyn J. Heinrich (born 1967) is the Patricia and Rodes Hart Professor of Public Policy, Education and Economics at Vanderbilt University.

Career

Prior to her appointment at Vanderbilt University, she was the Sid Richardson Professor of Public Affairs, affiliated Professor of Economics, and Director of the Center for Health and Social Policy (CHASP) at the Lyndon B. Johnson School of Public Affairs, University of Texas at Austin. She continues as a Research Professor at the University of Texas at Austin. She has also held professorships at the University of Wisconsin-Madison, where she served as the Director of the La Follette School of Public Affairs, and the University of North Carolina at Chapel Hill. She received her Ph.D. under the Nobel Laureate James Heckman at the University of Chicago Harris School of Public Policy and her undergraduate degree from Beloit College. She is currently researching a wide breadth of topics, focusing on education, workforce development, social welfare policy, program evaluation, and public management and performance management, allowing her to collaborate with federal, state, and local governments on policy design and program effectiveness. Heinrich received her Bachelor of Arts in International Relations, Economics, and Management from Beloit College in Wisconsin. She earned her Master of Arts in Public Policy at the University of Chicago, where she also earned her Doctor of Philosophy. In 2004, she received the David N. Kershaw Award for distinguished contributions to public policy analysis and management for a person under age 40, and in 2011, she was elected to the National Academy of Public Administration.

Selected publications

See also
 List of University of Texas at Austin faculty
 List of Vanderbilt University people
 List of University of Wisconsin-Madison people
 List of University of Chicago alumni
 List of economists

References

External links 
 Carolyn Heinrich at University of Texas at Austin
 Carolyn Heinrich at Vanderbilt University
 
 Carolyn Heinrich's publications on IDEAS/RePEc

University of Chicago alumni
University of Wisconsin–Madison faculty
Living people
University of Texas at Austin faculty
University of Wisconsin–Madison faculty
University of North Carolina at Chapel Hill faculty
Vanderbilt University faculty
Beloit College alumni
1967 births
21st-century American economists